The Thorhild Titans were a Junior "B" Ice Hockey team based in Thorhild, Alberta, Canada that played from 2009 until 2012. They were members of the North Eastern Alberta Junior B Hockey League (NEAJBHL), and played their home games at Thorhild Agriplex.

History 
The Thorhild Titans were created in 2009 by Manager and President Mike Theroux and are a member of the North Eastern Alberta Junior B Hockey League (NEAJBHL). The Team is based out of Thorhild AB, which is located 30 minutes north of Edmonton. The Titans have advanced to the playoffs in two of three seasons The Team has had 2 coaches John Mazerenko and Jason Johns who together hold a record of 15-131-2 after three seasons. The Titans currently have a 0-6 record in the playoffs not making it passed the first round.

The Thorhild Titans folded after the 2011-12 season.

Season-by-season record  
Note: GP = Games played, W = Wins, L = Losses, OTL = Overtime Losses, Pts = Points, GF = Goals for, GA = Goals against, PIM = Penalties in minutes

Roster

External links
Official website of the Thorhild Titans

Ice hockey teams in Alberta